The Thread That Keeps Us is the ninth studio album by American indie rock band Calexico. It was released on January 26, 2018, under Anti-.

Critical reception
The Thread That Keeps Us was described as "impassioned stories about border politics and environmental disasters" by Pitchfork (website), also describing it as "comfort food" that is "vital in spite of that familiarity." Exclaim! described it as an "overly long record" with "truly enjoyable moments."

Track listing

Charts

Personnel

Musicians
 Joey Burns – vocals, guitar, producer
 Scott Colberg – bass
 Sergio Mendoza – keyboards
 Jacob Valenzuela – backing vocals, trumpet
 Jairo Zavala – guitar, backing vocals
 Martin Wenk – drums, trumpet
 John Convertino – drums
 Johnny Contreras – backing vocals
 Evan Shelton – cello

Production
 Craig Schumacher – engineer, producer
 Tom Hagerman – engineer
 Thomas Small – engineer
 JJ Golden – mastering

References

2018 albums
Calexico (band) albums
Anti- (record label) albums